Hebenstreit (from  (obsolete) "to begin", "to start" plus Streit "dispute", "fight", "argument", thus literally "quarrel-monger") is a German surname from a nickname denoting a quarrelsome, cantankerous person and may refer to:

People 
Johann Ernst Hebenstreit (1703–1757), German physician and naturalist
Michael Hebenstreit (1812–1875), Austrian Kapellmeister and composer for stage music
Pantaleon Hebenstreit (1668–1750), German dance teacher, musician and composer

References 

German-language surnames
Surnames from nicknames